Brechin/Ronan Aircraft Aerodrome  is a registered aerodrome located  northwest of Brechin, Ontario, Canada. It is the only aerodrome in Canada to feature both terrestrial and water runways.

References

Transport in Simcoe County
Buildings and structures in Simcoe County

Registered aerodromes in Ontario

Seaplane bases in Ontario